The Żarnowiec Pumped Storage Power Station is located about  south of Żarnowiec in Puck County, northern Poland. The 680 MW pumped-storage power station was constructed between 1973 and 1983. The power station was modernised between 2007 and 2011 and the upper reservoir was reconstructed in 2006. It is the largest hydroelectric power station in Poland. It uses four 170 MW Francis pump-turbines to send water from its lower reservoir, Lake Żarnowiec, up to an upper reservoir for storage. During periods of high power demand, the water is released back down to the turbines to produce power. Water is pumped back up during periods of low power demand, such as night time. The power station was originally intended to be a load balancer for Żarnowiec Nuclear Power Plant which was supposed to be constructed on the opposite side of Lake Żarnowiec.

See also 

 Renewable energy in Poland

References 

Pumped-storage hydroelectric power stations in Poland
Energy infrastructure completed in 1983
Puck County
1983 establishments in Poland